Theta Persei (Theta Per, θ Persei, θ Per) is a star system 37 light years away from Earth, in the constellation Perseus.  It is one of the closest naked-eye stars.

The primary star is a yellowish dwarf (main sequence) star of spectral type F8V, which is somewhat larger and brighter than the Sun, but still within the range considered to have the potential for Earth-like planets. There is also a red dwarf companion of spectral type M1.V, orbiting about 250 AU from the primary.

An 11th-magnitude star is listed in double-star catalogues as component C of the multiple system. An unconfirmed companion, possibly a brown dwarf, was reported  from θ Persei B in 2010.

References

External links
 
 

Binary stars
Perseus (constellation)
F-type main-sequence stars
M-type main-sequence stars
Persei, Theta
Persei, Theta
Persei, 13
016895
012777
0799
BD+48 0746